The Ministry of Ecological Transition is a department of the Italian government. It was formed in 2021 by the Draghi Cabinet, and replaced the Ministry of the Environment.

Ministers
The ministry is led by the Italian Minister of the Environment.

Ilaria Fontana is Undersecretary of State.

See also

References

2021 establishments in Italy
Ministries established in 2021
Organisations based in Rome
Government ministries of Italy
Environment ministries
Environment of Italy